Gottfried "Gody" Schmutz (born 26 October 1954 in Hagenbuch, Switzerland) is a retired Swiss road racing cyclist. He was professional from 1977 to 1987. He was the Swiss National Road Race champion in 1978, 1980 and 1985.

Results
 1978
 Swiss Road Cycling Champion 1978
 3rd, Tour of Britain
 3rd, Stausee-Rundfahrt Klingnau
 3rd, Tour de Berne
 5th, Tour de Suisse
 6th, Tour de Romandie
 1979
 Winner, Tour de Berne
 2nd, Tour de Lausanne
 1980
 Swiss Road Cycling Champion 1980
 Winner, Tour de Lausanne
 8th, Tour of Flanders
 1981
 4th, Tour de Suisse
 10th, Tour de Romandie
 1985
 Swiss Road Cycling Champion 1985
 Winner, Grand Prix de Lugano

References

External links
 

1954 births
Living people
People from Winterthur District
Swiss male cyclists
Tour de Suisse stage winners
Sportspeople from the canton of Zürich